Oral cancer overexpressed 1 pseudogene 1 is a protein that in humans is encoded by the ORAOV1P1 gene.

References